Campo Militar 1 is a military installation located between Conscripto and Zapadores Avenue and the Belt Freeway in Mexico City. For the 1968 Summer Olympics, it hosted the riding and running portions of the modern pentathlon competition.

References
1968 Summer Olympics official report. Volume 2. Part 1. p. 79. 
Maps of Mexico profile of the camp. 

Venues of the 1968 Summer Olympics
Olympic modern pentathlon venues
Military installations of Mexico